21-Norcholestane, or 17β-Isoheptylandrostane is a 26-carbon (C26) sterane, found in eogene lacustrine sediments.

See also 
 Androstane
 Cholestane
 Nor-

References 

Steroids